Columbia College Hollywood (CCH) is a private college in Los Angeles, California. It is one of only 20 film institutions in the United States that have been awarded full membership by the International Association of Film and Television Schools (CILECT).

The college is accredited by the Western Association of Schools and Colleges Senior College and University Commission (WSCUC) to offer Bachelor of Fine Arts and associate degree programs in cinema, visual effects, and graphic design and interactive media.

History 
Columbia College Hollywood was founded in 1952 in the MacArthur Park neighborhood of Los Angeles as a branch campus of Columbia College in Chicago. The curriculum focused on the growing television and radio industries. In 1959, Columbia College Hollywood separated from the Chicago institution to operate as an independent, private, non-profit college.

In its early years, Columbia College Hollywood grew alongside the film and television industries, eventually moving from MacArthur Park in 1970 to a larger space on La Brea Ave in central Hollywood. The college established its current campus in 1997 when it moved into the former headquarters of Panavision in the Tarzana neighborhood of Los Angeles. In 2018, Columbia College Hollywood acquired the former Tribeca Flashpoint College, a creative media school in Chicago, Illinois, which became Columbia College Hollywood's first branch campus, now named Flashpoint Chicago, a campus of Columbia College Hollywood.

Campus

Los Angeles Main Campus 
Columbia College Hollywood is located on a 85,000-square-foot campus in the San Fernando Valley. The campus is in the city of Los Angeles in the Tarzana neighborhood, which got its name when it was built on land formerly owned by Edgar Rice Burroughs, the creator of Tarzan.

Students and staff have access to on-campus parking and nearby public transportation and railway hubs. The location is near Hollywood film and television studios including Walt Disney Studios, 20th Century Fox Film Studios, Paramount Pictures, Sony Picture Studios, and Universal Studios.

The Columbia College Hollywood campus features a 96-seat 5.1 channel surround sound theater for screenings, classes, and events, a 35-seat 7.1 channel surround sound screening room, a sound stage, a three-camera HD television stage with a green screen and control room, a Foley/ADR suite with a sound-isolated booth and control room, post-production editing suites, standing sets, an acting studio, writers' rooms, traditional classrooms, and an equipment room with industry standard film, video, and sound equipment. The campus also has a 5,000-square-foot Learning Resource Center that provides students with individual and collaborative study space.

Flashpoint Chicago Campus 
The Flashpoint Chicago campus occupies the fifth and sixths floors of the historic Burnham Center building at 28 North Clark Street in the downtown Chicago Loop.

The neighborhood is bordered on the north by Chicago's historic theatre district and the Chicago Riverwalk and on the east by Millennium Park and the shoreline of Lake Michigan.

Flashpoint's campus housed a 52-seat screening room, studio space for filmmaking and recording arts, sound design suites, animation and visual effects labs and an experiential design lab. The library and learning commons offer  study space and print and digital resources.

Flashpoint's film sound stage was located on the campus of Cinespace Studios in Chicago. It is a professional light-and-sound-controlled 10,000-square-foot environment with a three-wall set, an elephant door for drive-up loading and unloading, a 32-foot ceiling height, soundproof padded walls and ceiling, and a leveled floor for track-free dollying.

The campus and school closed in 2021.

Academics 
Columbia College Hollywood offers undergraduate degree programs focused on digital media arts, including film, graphic design, interactive media, visual effects, digital media production, and recording arts. Students also study liberal arts and sciences, such as the humanities, communication, fine arts, mathematics, natural sciences, and social/behavioral sciences.

The 2019 Los Angeles main campus degree programs include Bachelor of Fine Arts in Cinema, Bachelor of Fine Arts in Graphic Design + Interactive Media, Bachelor of Fine Arts in Visual Effects, and Associate of Fine Arts in Cinema. Online programs include Bachelor of Fine Arts in Graphic Design + Interactive Media and Bachelor of Fine Arts in Visual Effects.

2019 Flashpoint Chicago campus degree programs include Bachelor of Fine Arts in Cinema, Bachelor of Fine Arts in Graphic Design + Interactive Media, Bachelor of Fine Arts in Visual Effects, Associate of Fine Arts in Design + Visual Communication, Associate of Applied Science in Film, Associate of Applied Science in Recording Arts, and Associate of Fine Arts in Visual Effects + Animation. Online programs include Bachelor of Fine Arts in Graphic Design + Interactive Media, and Bachelor of Fine Arts in Visual Effects.

All Bachelor of Fine Arts degree students choose a focus for their studies in an area of interest called an emphasis, including as acting, cinematography, directing, digital marketing, and digital modeling.

Faculty 
The student-to-teacher ratio at Columbia College Hollywood is 12:1.

Many of the college's instructors are working industry professionals who have won Emmys, Golden Globes, and Academy Awards. Faculty have logged more than 150 feature films and 2,500 hours of television programming, and they have collectively created more than two dozen TV series. Films by faculty have been seen in more than 200 film festivals worldwide, and faculty have authored more than 2,000 articles and reviews, both scholarly and consumer, on film, television, the entertainment industry, and art and design.

Faculty members are also active members of the entertainment industry's most respected professional organizations and guilds, including the Academy of Motion Picture Arts and Sciences (AMPAS), the Academy of Television Arts and Sciences (Emmy), the Society of Motion Picture and Television Engineers (SMPTE), Society of Camera Operators [SOC],the Writers Guild of America (WGA), the Directors Guild of America (DGA), the Producers Guild of America (PGA), the American Society of Cinematographers (ASC), the Motion Picture Editors Guild (MPEG), the Higher Education Video Game Alliance (HEVGA), and the National Academy of Recording Arts & Sciences (NARAS).

Columbia College Hollywood's adjunct general education faculty members have academic backgrounds in the humanities, natural and social sciences, technology, business, and art.

Notable alumni 
Columbia College Hollywood alumni have worked in all areas of the film industry, from hit television shows and blockbuster films to animated features and independent productions.
 Robert Schwentke, German film director
 Jaume Collet-Serra, Spanish film director
 Timothy Linh Bui, Vietnamese-born American writer, director, and producer
 Jay Jennings, American independent film director
 Eagle Egilsson, Icelandic television director and cinematographer
 Brent Morin, American comedian, actor, and writer
 Blaaze, Real Name: Lakshmi Narasimha Vijaya Rajagopala Sheshadri Sharma Rajesh Raman, Tamil playback singer and rapper

Memberships 
The college is a member of:
 CILECT - International Association of Film and Television Schools
 University Film and Video Association (UFVA)
 Association of Independent Colleges and Universities (AICCU)
 National Association of Independent College and Universities (NAICU)

References

External links
 

Educational institutions established in 1952
Universities and colleges in Los Angeles County, California
Tarzana, Los Angeles
Film schools in California
1952 establishments in California
Private universities and colleges in California